The 1962 New Zealand tour rugby to Australia was the 20th tour by the New Zealand national rugby union team to Australia. 

The last tour of "All Blacks" in Australia was the 1957 tour, in 1960, New Zealand visit Australia on the way of their tour to South Africa

Australians visited New Zealand in 1958 

All Backs won all both test matches. The Bledisloe Cup was assigned after the Australian tour in New Zealand late in the same year.

The tour 
Scores and results list All Blacks' points tally first.

External links 
 New Zealand in Australia 1962 from rugbymuseum.co.nz

New Zealand tour
Australia tour
New Zealand national rugby union team tours of Australia